Arkansas Highway 399 (AR 399, Hwy. 399) is a short north–south highway in southwestern Arkansas. Its southern terminus is at an intersection with U.S. Route 70 Business (US 70 Bus.) in DeQueen. Its northern terminus is at US 70 west of DeQueen.

History
There was once a second roadway with the Highway 399 designation, located west of Foreman in Little River County. It was the old location of Highway 32 through Arkinda to the Oklahoma border. This road is now County Road 63.

Major intersections

References

External links

399
Transportation in Sevier County, Arkansas